Performance Propellers, officially Performance Propellers USA, LLC, is an American manufacturer of wooden propellers for homebuilt and ultralight aircraft. The company headquarters is located in Donie, Texas and was formerly in Patagonia, Arizona.

See also
List of aircraft propeller manufacturers

References

External links 

Aircraft propeller manufacturers
Aerospace companies of the United States